Haram is an Arabic term meaning 'Forbidden'. This may refer to either something sacred to which access is not allowed to the people who are not in a state of purity or who are not initiated into the sacred knowledge; or, in direct contrast, to an evil and thus "sinful action that is forbidden to be done". In Islamic jurisprudence, haram is used to refer to any act that is forbidden by God and is one of the five Islamic commandments that define the morality of human action.

Acts that are haram are typically prohibited in the religious texts of the Quran, and the  category of haram is the highest status of prohibition. If something is considered haram, it remains prohibited no matter how good the intention is or how honorable the purpose is. Views of different  or legal schools of thought can vary significantly regarding what is or is not haram based on the scholarly interpretation of the core religious texts (Quran and hadith).

Overview
Actions that are haram result in harm one way or another and are therefore considered a sin if carried out by a Muslim.

By bringing up the word "benefit" as an opposite to "sin", verse 2:219 of the Quran clarifies that haram is that which is harmful, in opposition to that which brings benefit; therefore, sin is that which hurts others or oneself.

An Islamic principle related to haram is that if something is prohibited or forbidden, then anything that leads to it is also considered a haram act. A similar principle is that the sin of haram is not limited to the person who engages in the prohibited activity, but the sin also extends to others who support the person in the activity, whether it be material or moral support.

  – Compulsory / "duty"
  – Recommended, "desirable"
  – Neutral, "permissible"
  – Disliked, "discouraged"
  – Sinful, "prohibited"

The two types of haram are:

  – Prohibited because of its essence and harm it causes to an individual
 Adultery, murder, theft
  – Prohibited because of external reasons that are not fundamentally harmful but are associated to something that is prohibited
 Ill-gotten wealth obtained through sin. Examples include money earned through cheating, stealing, corruption, murder, and interest, or any means that involve harm to another human being. Also, a deal or sale during Friday's prayers. It is prohibited in Islam for a Muslim to profit from such haram actions. Any believer who benefits from or lives off wealth obtained through haram is a sinner.
 Prayer in a house taken illegally.

The religious term haram, based on the Quran, is applied to:
 Actions, such as cursing, fornication, murder, and disrespecting one's parents
 Certain food and drinks, such as pork and alcohol.
 Some halal objects, foods, or actions that are normally halal (permissible) but under some conditions become haram. For example, halal food and drinks during the day in Ramadan or a cow or another halal animal that is not slaughtered in the Islamic way and in the name of Allah (God).
 Certain inaction, such as abandoning the  without a valid reason.

Culture 
In addition, the same word (haram) is used in the Quran to denote the sacred nature of the Ka'ba and the areas of Mecca, Medina, and Jerusalem. This category of sacred, holy, and inviolable also includes spouses and university campuses. As such, the legal use of the root  is based on an idea of boundaries between the profane and the sacred, as opposed to prohibitions, as is normally assumed.

Colloquially, the word haram takes on different meanings and operates more closely as a dichotomy with halal, which denotes the permissible. In Arabic-speaking countries, saying "haram" can mean 'what a shame' or 'what a pity' (this meaning has been adopted by Modern Hebrew slang as well and is alike to the Italian use of ). The term can be used formally as a method for chastising strangers who behave inappropriately, or between friends as a form of teasing. The word is also used to instruct children in how to behave by telling them that harming other children or animals is haram, among other things.

In this case, the term haram is used to mean ill-mannered or indecent, instead of strictly meaning 'unlawful'.

Halal and haram are also used in regards to money.  means ill-gotten money, and brings destruction on those who make their living through such means.

These cultural interpretations of what is haram influence and are influenced by the legal definitions used at a local level. This means that popular conceptions of haram are partly based on formal Islamic jurisprudence and partly on regional culture, and the popular conceptions, in turn, change how the legal system defines and punishes haram actions.

Forbidden categories of actions

Food and intoxicants

In the Quran and reports by early Muslims, forbidden meat includes pork, carnivores (lions, tigers, wolves, dogs, cats, etc.), non-ruminants (donkeys and horses), animals that were slaughtered in the name of a god other than Allah, animals that died due to illness, injury, stunning, poisoning, or slaughtering not in the name of Allah. If the animal is treated poorly, or tortured while being slaughtered, the meat is haram.

Marriage and family

Islam is very strict in prohibiting , whether it be adultery or sexual intercourse between two unmarried individuals.

In terms of marriage proposals, it is considered haram for a Muslim man to propose to a divorced or widowed woman during her  (the waiting period during which she is not allowed to marry again). The man is able to express his desire for marriage, but cannot execute an actual proposal. It is also forbidden for a Muslim man to propose to a woman who is married to another man.

It is considered haram for a Muslim woman to marry a non-Muslim man. This is due to the idea that the man is the head of the household, the one who supports the family, and the man is considered responsible for his wife. Muslims do not believe in giving women to the hands of those who do not practice Islam and having them responsible over Muslim women because they are not concerned with protecting the rites of the religion.

Inheritance
It is considered haram for a father to deprive his children of inheritance. It is also  haram for a father to deprive the women or the children of a wife who is not favorable to him an inheritance. Additionally, it is haram for one relative to deprive another relative of his inheritance through tricks.

Business ethics
, any excessive addition over and above the principal, such as usury and interest, is prohibited in Islam in all forms. It is also believed that  makes a person selfish and greedy.

All business and trade practices that do not result in a free and fair exchange of goods and services are considered haram, such as bribery, stealing, and gambling. Therefore, all forms of deceit and dishonesty in business are prohibited in Islam.

Clothing and adornment

In Islam, both gold adornments and silk cloths are prohibited for men to wear but are permissible for women as long as they are not used to sexually attract men (other than their husbands). The prohibition of these adornments is part of a broader Islamic principle of avoiding luxurious lifestyles.

It is considered haram for both men and women to wear clothing that fails to cover the body properly (which stated in clothing guidance, the term ) and clothes that are transparent. Additionally, Islam prohibits excess beautifying that involves the altering of one's physical appearance. In some Sunni sects, physical alterations that are considered haram such as tattoos, shortening of teeth, cosmetic surgery etc.

Some Islamic sects also prohibit the use of gold and silver utensils and pure silk spreads in the household in order to avoid luxurious lifestyles in the home. Statues are also prohibited in homes, and some Muslims are prohibited from participating in making statues because they think it negates .

Shirk

See also

References

External links
 Laws of Islam concerning food

Arabic words and phrases in Sharia
Islamic terminology
Sharia legal terminology